Pearls to Pigs is an LP and the seventh release by American electronic-alternative rock band Modwheelmood. The LP was released as an amalgam of the first three Pearls to Pigs EPs with a new track, "Happily Delayed", on June 2, 2009 at the first show of their West Coast tour in Scottsdale, Arizona. The album was digitally released in June 2009.

Track listing

Problem Me - 4:23
MHz - 4:45
Forli' - 1:28
Bellevue Ave - 4:23
Too Late - 3:22
Crumble - 4:08
Sunday Morning - 3:32
If I Was You - 4:03
Domenica Pomeriggio - 1:09
Scene - 3:17
Your Place - 00:23
Happily Delayed - 4:20
Lie - 3:41
Thursday - 4:16
Madrid-Changes - 2:40
Scared of Everyone - 5:56

Cover art

The cover art of the album is the band and album name written in braille.

References

2009 albums
Modwheelmood albums